Ozark is an American crime drama television series created by Bill Dubuque and Mark Williams for Netflix and produced by MRC Television and Aggregate Films. The series stars Jason Bateman and Laura Linney as Marty and Wendy Byrde, a married couple who move their family to the Lake of the Ozarks and become money launderers. 

The series received positive reviews from critics throughout its run, with particular praise for its tone, directing, production values, and performances (particularly those of Bateman, Linney, and Julia Garner). The series has received a total of 45 Primetime Emmy Award nominations, including three for Outstanding Drama Series, with Bateman winning for Outstanding Directing for a Drama Series in 2019 and Garner winning three times for Outstanding Supporting Actress in a Drama Series in 2019, 2020, and 2022. Bateman has received two further Golden Globe Award nominations for Best Actor – Television Series Drama.

Awards and nominations

Notes

References

External links
 

Ozark